A Little Death is a 16mm short film that was created by Simon Perkins and Paul Swadel in 1994. The film was nominated for Best Short Film in the New Zealand Film and TV Awards in 1995. Its concept evolved from an earlier idea called Into The Void, which involve a male character walking in on his lover in bed with another. The interest of the idea centred on the ambiguity of the lover's gender, and by inference the sexual orientation of the observer.

The film has been recognised as one of a select number of early NZ short films which pushed the envelope in terms of visual design and cinematic language.  Read a review of the short film featured in the NZ Pavement Magazine (1995). .

The script for this film was written as a Beatscript rather than a conventional screenplay. The film has been cited as one of a select number of shorts that heralded The Coming of Age of The New Zealand Short Film (Paul Shannon, 1995).

References

External links 
 A Little Death cast and crew credits
 Pavement magazine review
 
  The New Zealand Film Archive
  British Film Institute

New Zealand short films
1994 films